Artediellus is a genus of marine ray-finned fishes belonging to the family Cottidae, the typical sculpins. Most of the fishes in this genus are found in the northern Pacific Ocean but they also occur in the Arctic and North Atlantic Oceans.

Taxonomy
Artediellus was first proposed as a monospecific genus in 1885 by the American ichthyologist David Starr Jordan with Cottus uncinatus, which was described in 1834 from Greenland by the Danish zoologist Johan Reinhardt, as its only species and designated as its type species. The 5th edition of Fishes of the World classifies the genus Artediellus within the subfamily Cottinae of the family Cottidae, however, other authors classify the genus within the subfamily Psychrolutinae of the family Psychrolutidae.

Etymology
Artediellus is a diminutive of Artedius, a genus of similar fishes but these do not have the naked body and head of Artediellus.

Species
There are currently fifteen recognized species in this genus, which are split into two subgenera:

 Subgenus Artediellus D. S. Jordan, 1885
 Artediellus aporosus Soldatov, 1922
 Artediellus atlanticus D. S. Jordan & Evermann, 1898 (Atlantic hookear sculpin)
 Artediellus camchaticus C. H. Gilbert & Burke, 1912
 Artediellus gomojunovi Taranetz, 1933
 Artediellus ingens D. W. Nelson, 1986
 Artediellus miacanthus C. H. Gilbert & Burke, 1912
 Artediellus neyelovi Muto, Yabe & Amaoka, 1994
 Artediellus ochotensis C. H. Gilbert & Burke, 1912
 Artediellus pacificus C. H. Gilbert, 1896 (Hookhorn sculpin)
 Artediellus scaber Knipowitsch, 1907 (Hamecon)
 Artediellus schmidti Soldatov, 1915
 Artediellus uncinatus (J. C. H. Reinhardt, 1834) (Arctic hookear sculpin)
 Subgenus Artediellops Neeelov, 1979
 Artediellus dydymovi Soldatov, 1915
 Artediellus fuscimentus D. W. Nelson, 1986
 Artediellus minor (M. Watanabe, 1958)

Characteristics
Artediellus sculpins have wide heads. They have both vomerine teeth and palatine teeth. They have 2 spines on the preoperculum, the upper spine is the largest and is hooked upwards with no supplementary spines. The skin is smooth and naked. The first, spiny dorsal fin is short and is not incised.

Distribution and habitat
Artediellus sculpins Are found mainly in the North Pacific Ocean, although some species are found in the Arctic and Atlantic Oceans.

References

Cottinae
 
Taxa named by David Starr Jordan
Ray-finned fish genera